The 1962 Dartmouth Indians football team was an American football team that represented Dartmouth College during the 1962 NCAA University Division football season. The Indians were undefeated and won the Ivy League championship.

In their eighth season under head coach Bob Blackman, the Indians compiled a 9–0 record and outscored opponents 232 to 57. William King was the team captain.

The Indians' 7–0 conference record was the best in the Ivy League. The Indians outscored Ivy opponents 199 to 54. 

Dartmouth played its home games at Memorial Field on the college campus in Hanover, New Hampshire.

Schedule

References

Dartmouth
Dartmouth Big Green football seasons
Ivy League football champion seasons
College football undefeated seasons
Dartmouth Indians football